Max Grünhut (7 July 1893 – 6 February 1964) was a German-British legal scholar and criminologist. Of Jewish descent, he emigrated to the United Kingdom to escape Nazism in 1939. Prior to that, he was held a professorship at the University of Bonn.

In England, he taught at the University of Oxford, becoming one of the most important British criminologists of his era, along with fellow emigrants  and Leon Radzinowicz.

Works

Further reading

1893 births
1964 deaths
German legal scholars
Jewish emigrants from Nazi Germany to the United Kingdom
Commanders Crosses of the Order of Merit of the Federal Republic of Germany